Santeuil is a commune in the Val-d'Oise département in Île-de-France in northern France. Inhabitants are known as Santeuillais (male) or Santeuillaises (female).

See also
Communes of the Val-d'Oise department

References

External links
Official website 

Association of Mayors of the Val d'Oise 

Communes of Val-d'Oise